Hanne Kalleberg (born 1987 in Flekkefjord, Norway) is a Norwegian jazz singer and composer.

Career 
Kalleberg is a graduate of the Norwegian Academy of Music in Oslo. She released her debut album Papirfly (2013), within her own quartet 'Papirfly' (former name Hanne Kalleberg Kvartett). Here she collaborates with Philip Birkenes, Jakop Janssønn and Knut Olav Buverud Sandvik. She is also in the project 'Grønske', constituted by additional Ragnhild Briseid, Kjersti Støylen and Elisabeth Wulfsberg. They play self composed music for children, and has a show called "Climatus – Isbjørnen som vil redde jordkloden" (Climatus – The polar bear wants to save the planet earth) about climate and the environment.

Discography 
Within her own quartet Papirfly
2013: Papirfly (NorCD)

References 

21st-century Norwegian singers
Norwegian women jazz singers
Norwegian jazz singers
Musicians from Flekkefjord
Norwegian jazz composers
Male jazz composers
Norwegian Academy of Music alumni
1987 births
Living people
21st-century Norwegian women singers
21st-century Norwegian male singers